Bellevue Palace may refer to:
Bellevue Palace (Germany), the official residence of the President of Germany in Berlin
Bellevue Palace (France) or Château de Bellevue
Bellevue Palace (Turkey), a former hotel in Ankara (also known as Belvü Palas)
Hotel Bellevue Palace, a luxury hotel in Berne, Switzerland